Rudolph Hittmair (born 1859 in Mattighofen) was an Austrian clergyman and bishop for the Roman Catholic Diocese of Linz. He was ordained in 1888. He was appointed bishop in 1909. He died in 1915.

References 

1859 births
1915 deaths
Austrian Roman Catholic bishops
People from Braunau am Inn District